Ivo Canelas (born 23 December 1973) is a Portuguese theatre and film actor that has appeared in more than fifty films since 1994.

Selected filmography

References

External links
 

1973 births
Living people
People from Lisbon
Portuguese male film actors
Portuguese male television actors